The Fred Hamilton Rhododendron Garden is the only public botanical garden in the northeast Georgia mountains specializing in Rhododendrons and Native Azaleas, located on the Georgia Mountain Fairgrounds property, 1311 Music Hall Road (off US Highway 76 West), Hiawassee, Georgia. The garden is a 501(c)(3) nonprofit organization, open to the public daily; a donation is requested.

The garden was established in 1982 when Fred Hamilton, a plant breeder and former Sears, Roebuck and Company executive, donated his garden by moving about 1,000 rhododendrons to the present site. Hamilton is known for developing the domestic yellow azalea, named Hazel after his wife.

Today the garden contains more than 3,000 hybrid rhododendrons, one of the largest such collections in Georgia. It is laid out on a hillside sloping to Lake Chatuge, with walking paths along the lake shore. Bloom time is from early April to late May.

See also
 List of botanical gardens in the United States

Botanical gardens in Georgia (U.S. state)
Protected areas of Towns County, Georgia
1982 establishments in Georgia (U.S. state)